The 2017 U Sports Women's Ice Hockey Championship was held from March 16–19, 2017, in Napanee, Ontario. The entire tournament was played at Strathcona Paper Centre, near the campus of Queen's University.

Participating teams

Championship Bracket

Consolation Bracket

Awards and honors
Tournament MVP: Lindsey Post, Alberta

Players of the Game

All-Tournament Team

See also 
2017 U Sports University Cup

References 

U Sports women's ice hockey
Ice hockey competitions in Ontario
2016–17 in Canadian ice hockey
Greater Napanee
2017 in Ontario